Sedona Airport  is a non-towered airport located  southwest of the central business district of Sedona, a city in Yavapai County, Arizona, United States.

Although most U.S. airports use the same three-letter location identifier for the FAA and IATA, Sedona Airport is assigned SEZ by the FAA and SDX by the IATA (which assigned SEZ to Seychelles International Airport in Mahé, Seychelles).

The airport is located on top of a high mesa overlooking a major portion of the city; it has been termed a tabletop runway. It is not uncommon for tourists or locals driving around downtown Sedona to see an approaching airplane fly overhead and then suddenly disappear into the mountains without ever appearing to land. The airport is also located very close to the Red Rocks of Sedona.

The airport is well known as being the location of the flying lessons on the ground and in the air in Microsoft Flight Simulator, where it is also one of the handcrafted airports, giving real-life detail of the taxiways and runway.

History 

The airport was inaugurated in 1955. At that time it had no paved runway, and animals such as coyotes could be seen walking around the air-strip. This proved dangerous to pilots arriving at Sedona. By 1957, a small, paved runway had been built.

By 1990, the airport's runway had been improved and it had begun to receive service from a local scheduled airline. Air Sedona, founded by Jack Seeley in 1981, served Sedona from such places as Sky Harbor International Airport in Phoenix, Las Vegas, the nearby Grand Canyon airport and others until 1995. Sedona's airport is not able to accommodate commercial jets of a size of a Boeing 737 or larger. It does, however, attract a large number of smaller business jets and aircraft such as Cessna and Beech airplanes and helicopters.

At one point, the airport was served by Desert Pacific Airlines.

Scenic Airlines discontinued service at Sedona in April 1997.

Accidents and incidents 
On April 13, 2003, a Beechcraft Bonanza carrying three people collided with terrain after striking the fence to the southwest of runway 21. The flight instructor, student, and passenger were all fatally injured in the crash.
Two-time Olympic distance runner Pat Porter, his 15-year-old son Connor, and a friend of his son, 14-year-old Connor Mantsch, died when their airplane, a Beechcraft Duke piloted by Porter, crashed after takeoff from the airport, on July 26, 2012.
On April 25, 2021,  a Cessna 182 Skylane crashed, resulting in two people injured.

References

External links 

 Sedona Airport, official web site
 Sedona Airport (SEZ) at Arizona DOT airport directory
  
 openNav: SDX / KSEZ charts

Sedona, Arizona
Airports in Yavapai County, Arizona